The IMA approved mineral faustite, named after the American mineralogist and petrologist with the U.S. Geological Survey (USGS) Dr. George Tobias Faust, is a member of the triclinic turquoise group of hydrous phosphates with the following chemical composition:

ZnAl6(PO4)4(OH)8·4H2O

Some divalent copper generally replaces the zinc position. Faustite is the zinc rich analogue of turquoise having almost four times as much zinc than copper in its crystal structure. Trivalent (ferric) iron may replace some of the aluminum. Minor amounts of calcium may also be present. It has a hardness of 4.5 - 5.5 on the Mohs scale of mineral hardness and aside from having a slightly lower hardness, it may be difficult to distinguish it from turquoise in hand specimens.

Faustite has a blue-green to apple green color in polished cabochons, and may be presented as a turquoise imitation, and it may also be treated with stabilizers for jewelry making.

References

IMA Database of Mineral Properties - Faustite
Mindat.org - Faustite
Webmineral.com - Faustite Mineral Data

Phosphate minerals
Triclinic minerals
Minerals in space group 2